North Macedonia–Slovenia relations are foreign relations between the Republic of North Macedonia and the Republic of Slovenia. Both countries are members of the Council of Europe, and NATO. 
The two countries have very close political and economic relations. Once part of SFR Yugoslavia, the two republics declared independence in 1991 (Slovenia in June, North Macedonia in September) and recognised each other's independence on 12 February 1992. Diplomatic relations between both countries were established on 17 March 1992. Slovenia supports North Macedonia's sovereignty, territorial integrity, its Euro-integration and visa liberalisation.

Economic relations
A significant number of Slovenian investments ended up in North Macedonia. In 2007, about 70 million euros were invested. In January 2009, the prime minister of North Macedonia Nikola Gruevski announced, that he expects more Slovenian investments in infrastructure and energy projects. Over 70 Slovenian companies are present on the market of North Macedonia.

Agreements
Free Trade Agreement
Agreement on Reciprocal Promotion and Protection of Investments
Treaty on the Regulation of Reciprocal Property Law Relations and the Convention on the Avoidance of Double Taxation relating to Income and Property Tax

See also
 Foreign relations of North Macedonia
 Foreign relations of Slovenia 
 Accession of North Macedonia to the European Union
 Macedonians in Slovenia

References

External links
Republic of Slovenia - Government Communication Office (from 2002)

 
Slovenia
North Macedonia